Ebb Cade (17 March 1890 – 13 April 1953) was a construction worker at Clinton Engineer Works at Oak Ridge and was the first person subjected to injection with plutonium as an experiment.

Ebb Cade was born on 17 March 1890 in Macon County, Georgia, the son of Evens and Carrie Cade. Ebb Cade was married to Ida Cade. At the age of 63, Cade died as a result of ventricular fibrillation followed by heart failure on 13 April 1953 in Greensboro, Guilford County, North Carolina.


Plutonium injection
On 23 March 1945 Cade was on his way to work at a construction site for the Manhattan Project when he was involved in a traffic accident at Oak Ridge, Tennessee. He was an African-American cement worker for the J.A. Jones Construction Company. Cade presented at the Oak Ridge Hospital with fractures of right patella, right radius and ulna and left femur. Dr. Hymer Friedell, deputy medical director of the Manhattan Engineer District, determined that as Cade was, as he characterized, a "well developed..well nourished" "colored male", he was suitable for "experimentation" with plutonium injection. Doctors left his fractures untreated for 20 days until after plutonium injections began on April 10 1945. Cade received the injections at the Oak Ridge Hospital on the Clinton Engineer Works reservation at Oak Ridge, Tennessee without his assent or knowledge. He became known as HP-12 (Human Product-12), and was the first person to be injected with Pu-239. In order to test the migration of plutonium through his body, subsequently fifteen of Cade's teeth were extracted, and bone samples taken.

Beginning in 1945 and until 1947 a total of 18 people were part of a series of studies that involved the injection of Plutonium. In Rochester, New York at Strong Memorial Hospital 11 people were injected. In Chicago, Illinois, three individuals received injections at Billings Hospital of the University of Chicago. In San Francisco, California, three people were injected at the University Hospital of the University of California, San Francisco. The first person injected in California was Albert Stevens. Urine and feces samples were collected from the test subjects and forwarded to Los Alamos (also known as Project Y) for plutonium analysis. The studies were utilized to formulate mathematical equations necessary to establish plutonium excretion rates.

References

External links
 Record Group 326 (Box descriptions). This is the box cited by Denise Kiernan as containing relevant correspondence
 

Nuclear power
Plutonium
Oak Ridge National Laboratory
1890 births
1953 deaths
People from Macon County, Georgia
Heart diseases
Manhattan Project people
Human subject research in the United States